Liber Daniel Quiñones Prieto (born February 11, 1985 in Montevideo, Uruguay) is a Uruguayan professional football Midfielder.

Teams
  Racing de Montevideo 2006–2010
  Cobreloa 2010
  Racing de Montevideo 2011
  Gimnasia LP 2011
  Racing de Montevideo 2012–2013
  Danubio 2013
  Veracruz 2014
  Universitario de Deportes 2015
  Racing de Montevideo 2015–2017
  Santa Tecla 2018

References

External links
 
 

1985 births
Living people
Uruguayan footballers
Uruguayan expatriate footballers
Racing Club de Montevideo players
Cobreloa footballers
Danubio F.C. players
Club de Gimnasia y Esgrima La Plata footballers
C.D. Veracruz footballers
Club Universitario de Deportes footballers
Uruguayan Primera División players
Liga MX players
Expatriate footballers in Chile
Expatriate footballers in Argentina
Expatriate footballers in Mexico
Expatriate footballers in Peru
Santa Tecla F.C. footballers
Association football forwards